Wapshott is a surname. Notable people with the surname include:

Kellie Wapshott (born 1981), Australian race walker
Nicholas Wapshott  (born 1952), British journalist, broadcaster, and writer